Narkissos is a ballet made by Edward Villella to music by Robert Prince, from an idea by William D. Roberts. The premiere took place on 21 July 1966, with the New York City Ballet at the Saratoga Performing Arts Center, Saratoga Springs, NY.

Original cast  
  
 Patricia McBride

 Edward Villella
 Michael Steele

Reviews 
NY Times review by Harold C. Schonberg, July 22, 1966
NY Times review by Clive Barnes, November 25, 1966
Sunday NY Times review by Clive Barnes, April 23, 1967

New York City Ballet repertory
Ballets by Edward Villella
Ballets by Robert Prince
1966 ballet premieres